Kębłów may refer to the following places in Poland:
Kębłów, Lower Silesian Voivodeship (south-west Poland)
Kębłów, Lublin Voivodeship (east Poland)
Kębłów, Subcarpathian Voivodeship (south-east Poland)